William Forbes Marshall (8 May 1888 – January 1959) was an Irish poet and Presbyterian minister from Sixmilecross, County Tyrone, Ireland.

Marshall's father was principal teacher at Sixmilecross National School, where he was first educated. He was further educated at Royal School Dungannon (for which Marshall wrote the school song) and then Queens College Galway. He served as a Presbyterian minister at Castlerock, County Londonderry for over thirty years. Known as "The Bard of Tyrone", Marshall composed poems such as Hi Uncle Sam, Me an' me Da (subtitled Livin' in Drumlister), Sarah Ann and Our Son.

Marshall was a leading authority on Mid Ulster English (the predominant dialect of Ulster), and broadcast a series on the BBC entitled Ulster Speech. A prolific writer and poet, he also wrote Ulster Sails West, a book on people from Ulster who settled in North America during the 18th century. The W.F. Marshall Summer School is an annual event held at Magee College in Londonderry in honour of Marshall.

References

Links
 http://www.ulsterancestry.com/newsletter-content.php?id=377 
 Ulster History Circle

People educated at the Royal School Dungannon
People from County Tyrone
Male poets from Northern Ireland
Presbyterian ministers from Northern Ireland
Ulster Scots people
1888 births
1959 deaths
20th-century poets from Northern Ireland
Male writers from Northern Ireland
20th-century British male writers